Jetman may refer to:
 Jetman, a character in a series of video games:
 Jetpac, 1983 
 Lunar Jetman, 1983
 Solar Jetman: Hunt for the Golden Warpship, 1990
 Jetpac Refuelled, 2007
 Chōjin Sentai Jetman, the 1991 Super Sentai television series.
 Jetman, nickname for Swiss inventor and aviator Yves Rossy